MALINTENT is a technological system that was developed by the U.S. Department of Homeland Security to be implemented for detection of potential terrorist suspects.

The system does various test scanning for elevated blood pressure, rapid heart and breath rate, and non-verbal cues. According to the scientists, the MALINTENT system uses a barrage of non-invasive sensors and imagers to detect and evaluate a person's facial expressions to gauge whether the suspect could be planning to commit an attack or crime.

If the sensors pick up anything considered alarming, analysts can decide whether to subject a person to questioning.

See also
 ADVISE
 Information Awareness Office
 MATRIX
 Psycho-Pass
 Surveillance

References

United States Department of Homeland Security
Physiological instruments
Surveillance
Biometrics